KMAD-FM (102.5 FM) is a radio station broadcasting a mainstream rock music format and is known as Mad Rock 102.5 (Mad Rock One Oh Two Five). The station is licensed to Whitesboro, Texas, United States, and owned by Alpha Media, LLC based in Portland, Oregon.

The KMAD-FM broadcast studios, production facilities and business offices are located at One Grand Centre, 1800 Teague Drive (Suite 300) in Sherman, TX. KMAD-FM is responsible for the activation of the Sherman-Denison metropolitan area Emergency Alert System.

References

External links
Mad Rock 102.5 Website

MAD-FM
Mainstream rock radio stations in the United States
Alpha Media radio stations